An Caiseal (anglicized as Cashel) is a small Gaeltacht village on the east side of Achill Island in County Mayo, Republic of Ireland. Villages neighboring Cashel include Gob an Choire, Bun an Churraigh and Sáile.

The village has one shop, one postbox, two pubs, and a number of other businesses. It is served by the Bus Éireann 440 once a day in each direction.

References

External links 
 Achill Tourism 

Villages in Achill Island
Gaeltacht places in County Mayo